Microbacterium nanhaiense is a Gram-positive, heterotrophic, anaerobic, non-spore-forming, rod-shaped and non-motile bacterium from the genus Microbacterium which has been isolated from sea sediments from the South China Sea.

References

External links
Type strain of Microbacterium nanhaiense at BacDive -  the Bacterial Diversity Metadatabase	

Bacteria described in 2015
nanhaiense